Nigino is a rural locality (a village) and the administrative center of Niginskoye Rural Settlement, Nikolsky District, Vologda Oblast, Russia. The population was 399 as of 2002. There are 13 streets.

Geography 
Nigino is located 19 km northwest of Nikolsk (the district's administrative centre) by road. Lashovo is the nearest rural locality.

References 

Rural localities in Nikolsky District, Vologda Oblast